Konstantin Vladimirovich Ivashchenko (born 3 October 1963) is a Russian and Ukrainian politician and businessman who served as the de facto mayor of Mariupol from 6 April 2022 to 23 January 2023, following the capture of the city by the Donetsk People's Republic (DPR) and Russian troops.

Early life and career 
Konstantin Vladimirovich Ivashchenko was born on 3 October 1963 in Zhdanov (now Mariupol), then in the Ukrainian Soviet Socialist Republic of the Soviet Union. In 1985, he graduated from the Saratov Military Command Engineering High School of Missile Forces with a degree in engineering. Since 1992, he has been working at the Azovmash machine-building enterprise and has been the head of company since 2020.

Political career 
In 2010 local elections, he was elected to the Mariupol City Council as a member of the Party of Regions. He headed the party's Zhovtnevy district Mariupol branch. In 2015, he ran for the City Council as a member of Our Land. Since 2016, he has been a member of the executive committee of the Mariupol City Council. He was the head of the Mariupol branch of the Nashi party. He was elected deputy in the Mariupol City Council once again in 2020 as a member of the Opposition Platform — For Life.

2022 Russian invasion of Ukraine 
Following the partial capture of Mariupol by the Donetsk People's Republic (DPR) and Russian troops, Ivashchenko was appointed mayor of Mariupol by Denis Pushilin, the head of the Donetsk People's Republic. On 9 April, the Prosecutor's Office of the Donetsk Oblast notified Ivashchenko in absentia of suspicion of high treason committed under martial law. Ivashchenko was ordered to clear parts of downtown of rubble and bodies for a celebration of Victory Day on 9 May. Ivashchenko allegedly told the residents of Mariupol that the city will be annexed by Russia and incorporated into the Rostov Oblast. On 26 August, the Ukrainian Resistance Center reported that he left the city following an assassination attempt under the guise of medical treatment. Ivashchenko was relieved of his duties on 23 January 2023 and replaced by Oleg Morgun.

Sanctions 
In July 2022 the EU imposed sanctions on Konstantin Ivashchenko in relation to the 2022 Russian invasion of Ukraine.

Notes

References 

1963 births
Living people
Politicians from Mariupol
Party of Regions politicians
Our Land (Ukraine) politicians
Opposition Platform — For Life politicians
Ukrainian collaborators with Russia during the 2022 Russian invasion of Ukraine
Businesspeople from Donetsk Oblast